2002 Emperor's Cup Final was the 82nd final of the Emperor's Cup competition. The final was played at National Stadium in Tokyo on January 1, 2003. Kyoto Purple Sanga won the championship.

Overview
Kyoto Purple Sanga won their 1st title, by defeating Kashima Antlers 2–1 with Park Ji-sung and Teruaki Kurobe goal.

Match details

See also
2002 Emperor's Cup

References

Emperor's Cup
2002 in Japanese football
Kyoto Sanga FC matches
Kashima Antlers matches